De Courten is a surname. Notable people with the surname include:

 Juan de Courten (elder) (1730–1796), Spanish general
 Juan de Courten (younger) (fl 1810s), Spanish general
 Raffaele de Courten (1888–1978), Italian admiral